The Divine Caste (Spanish: La casta divina) is a 1977 Mexican historical drama film directed by Julián Pastor and starring Ignacio López Tarso, Ana Luisa Peluffo and Pedro Armendáriz Jr. The film is set in Yucatán around the time of the Mexican Revolution and portrays the social upheaval following General Salvador Alvarado's arrival in the area.

Cast
 Ignacio López Tarso as Don Wilfrido
 Ana Luisa Peluffo as Tulita
 Pedro Armendáriz Jr. as Abel Ortiz Argumedo
 Tina Romero as Elidé
 Jorge Martínez de Hoyos as General Salvador Alvarado
 Sergio Calderón as Padre Chano
 René Cardona as Consul Cubano
 Roberto Dumont as Teniente Máximo
 Blanca Torres as Doña Amira
 Marissa Maynez as Charito
 Miguel Ángel Ferriz as Panelio Peón
 Jorge Balzaretti as Efraín
 Lina Montes as Doña Engracia
 Ignacio Retes as Don Emilio
 José Nájera as Don Nico
 Julio Monterde as Don Gabriel
 César Sobrevals as Crisanto
 Refugio Flores as Gloria
 Sandra Cabargo as Rosa
 Alejandra de la Cruz as Matux
 Beatriz Marín as La Tiple
 León Singer as Don Diego Rendón
 Max Kerlow as Arzobispo de Yucatán
 Martín Palomares as Justino
 Eduardo Ocaña as Moisés
 Jorge Fegán as Don Ambrosio
 Federico Castillo as Carlos
 Alicia García as Niña Maya
 Wilberto Herrera as Carretero viejo
 Fabio Ramírez as Don Alberto
 Celia Acevedo as Tomasa
 Neyda Vargas as Chana
 Alfredo Novelo as Dr. Rosales
 Erica Mireles as Del Carmen
 Silvia Manríquez as Claudette
 Carlos Aguilar as General Jara
 Mário Herrera as Soldado
 Manolo del Río as Borracho
 Joaquín Cortez as Artesano
 Roberto Obregon as Professor
 Hernando Herrera as Empresario
 Gualberto Trejo as Bohemio I
 Sergio Duarte as Bohemio II

References

Bibliography 
 Mora, Carl J. Mexican Cinema: Reflections of a Society, 1896-2004. McFarland & Co, 2005.

External links 
 

1977 films
1970s historical drama films
Mexican historical drama films
1970s Spanish-language films
Films set in the 1910s
Films set in Mexico
1977 drama films
1970s Mexican films